Regional Sports Centre, also known as Rajiv Gandhi Indoor Stadium is a multipurpose sports centre in Kochi, Kerala, India.

This Indoor stadium has a capacity of 10,000 persons and is named after former Indian Prime Minister  Rajiv Gandhi.

Indoor Tennis Complex has four synthetic tennis courts with modern technology. Indoor Tennis Complex was inaugurated in 2000 by Padma Bhushan   Ramanathan Krishnan.

Table Tennis Hall has four tables with a latest Butterfly Robot with a capacity to hold 400 balls at a time. The stadium has a swimming pool with 25*10 meters.

References

Sports venues in Kochi
Indoor arenas in Kerala
Badminton venues
1993 establishments in Kerala
Sports venues completed in 1993
20th-century architecture in India